Lake Cormorant is an unincorporated community located in DeSoto County, Mississippi, United States.

Lake Cormorant has a post office and a zip code of 38641.

Klack's General Store in Lake Cormorant is where blues singer Son House was recorded for the Library of Congress in 1941.

History
Just to the east is the Lake Cormorant site of a former Mississippian culture Quizquiz village, which is likely one visited by Hernando de Soto in 1542.

Geography
Lake Cormorant lies in the flood plain of the Mississippi River, just south of a former oxbow lake channel of that river.  It is just east of Lake Cormorant Bayou, another channel remnant of the river, and now a tributary of the Coldwater River, a yazoo stream.

Levees and floodways built under the federal Flood Control Act of 1928 divert water away from the hamlet, and into the Lake Cormorant Bayou.

Climate
The climate in this area is characterized by hot, humid summers and generally mild to cool winters.  According to the Köppen Climate Classification system, Lake Cormorant has a humid subtropical climate, abbreviated "Cfa" on climate maps.

Notable people
 Tommy Bankhead, blues musician.
 Joe Henderson, professional baseball player in the 1970s.

Gallery

References

Unincorporated communities in DeSoto County, Mississippi
Unincorporated communities in Mississippi
Memphis metropolitan area